Billie Pittman McWatters (born August 1, 1942) is a former American football fullback who played in the National Football League and in several minor leagues. He played college football at North Texas.

Early life and high school
McWatters was born and grew up in Donie, Texas and attended Teague High School. He was named All-Central Texas and All-District in football as a senior.

College career
McWatters was a member of the North Texas State Eagles for three seasons. He became a starter as a sophomore and was used primarily as a blocking back. McWatters left the team after his junior year to play professionally.

Professional career
McWatters was selected in the eighth round of the 1964 NFL Draft by the Minnesota Vikings. In training camp as a rookie, Tom Franckhauser suffered a near-fatal and career-ending brain injury when he attempted to tackle McWatters during a scrimmage. He played in 11 games with one start as rookie, serving mostly as the backup to Pro Bowl fullback Bill Brown and rushing for 60 yards and one touchdown on 14 carries. He then signed with the Florida Brahmans of the North American Football League. He joined the Richmond Rebels of the Continental Football League in 1966. McWatters was signed by the Richmond Roadrunners of the Atlantic Coast Football League in 1967 and played there for two seasons.

References

1942 births
Living people
North Texas Mean Green football players
Minnesota Vikings players
American football fullbacks
Players of American football from Texas
Continental Football League players
Atlantic Coast Football League players
People from Freestone County, Texas